8th parallel may refer to:

8th parallel north, a circle of latitude in the Northern Hemisphere
8th parallel south, a circle of latitude in the Southern Hemisphere